Soul Blazer, released in Japan as , is an action role-playing video game developed by Quintet and published by Enix for the Super Nintendo Entertainment System. It was released in 1992 in Japan and North America, but not released in Europe until 1994.

It is an action role-playing game where the player takes the role of The Master's servant, to destroy monsters and release the captured souls of a world's inhabitants. The servant can be named by the player; however, in a later game developed by Quintet, Illusion of Gaia, he is referred to as "Blazer".

Gameplay

The player frees a series of towns by fighting monsters in traditional dungeon crawl battles. Destroying monster lairs in the dungeons causes a soul belonging to a former town occupant to be liberated and reincarnated. This is often a human, but it could be anything from a dolphin to a talking tulip. As souls are freed, the town is reconstructed around the people. The new town occupants give the player advice and items. When the player defeats the boss monster imprisoning the soul of the head of each town, the area is cleared and the player can continue. After the hero frees the first six villages, he is granted access to the "World of Evil", where the final villain awaits.

Plot
The Master sends one of his heavenly divine companions in the form of a human warrior to the Freil Empire, where the evil spirit Deathtoll has destroyed all villages and incarcerated the souls of all living creatures in his monster lairs, leaving the world empty. The warrior must defeat the monsters and liberate the inhabitants from the lairs, gradually repopulating the kingdom.

The Hero (Blazer) is the protagonist, a divine angel, deity or lesser-deity, or avatar, sent by The Master to restore the world's creatures to life. Skilled with a sword and possessing the ability to speak with any living thing and be understood, he battles the hordes of Deathtoll with the assistance of his Soul helpers. 

The warrior travels throughout the kingdom, defeating monsters in each of six regions to gather six magic stones, each a different color, in order to open the path to Deathtoll, who now resides in the World of Evil. The warrior must also find three sacred artifacts to call upon the power of the phoenix to defeat Deathtoll.

On the way, the warrior falls in love with Lisa, the daughter of a brilliant inventor named Dr. Leo. The warrior learns that the world's devastation came about after King Magridd imprisoned Dr. Leo and forced him to make a machine to contact Deathtoll. After being summoned, Deathtoll offered the king a gold piece for each soul from his kingdom, and under the counsel of his wife, Magridd agreed, but was eventually imprisoned himself. Dr. Leo is still in Magridd Castle's prison after the warrior frees him, and Leo later sacrifices his life to kill the queen, who still wanted to bargain with Deathtoll.

After reaching the World of Evil and defeating Deathtoll, the warrior is returned to Heaven. However, one year later, the Master realizes that the warrior misses his life as a human, and agrees to send him back to the Freil Empire, but under the condition that the hero would not have any memory of his past. The hero wakes up in Grass Valley, where Lisa recognizes him. Though he does not remember her, they leave together and renew their friendship.

Development and release
Soul Blazer was released on January 31, 1992 in Japan, on November 27 in North America, and on January 27, 1994 in Europe.

The soundtrack of the game was composed by Yukihide Takekawa. It was published in Japan by the record label Apollon on February 21, 1992.

The game has never been re-released in any form.

Reception 

Quintet reported that Soul Blazer sold 200,000 copies in Japan, 70,000 copies in North America, and 25,000 copies in Europe, adding up to 295,000 cartridges sold worldwide.

Upon release, Famitsu magazine's four reviewers scored the game 32 out of 40. Game Informer magazine reviewed the game in 1992, with its three reviewers scoring it 8.5, 8.75 and 8.5 out of 10. In its first issue, GameFans two reviewers scored it 95% and 92%. Electronic Gaming Monthlys four reviewers scored it 8, 9, 8 and 8 out of 10, and gave it the Editor's Choice Gold award. They compared it favorably with The Legend of Zelda: A Link to the Past, with one of the reviewers stating that Soul Blazer is equally challenging and fun to play. Dragon gave the game 3 out of 5 stars. M! Games gave it 78%. 

IGN ranked Soul Blazer 76th on its "Top 100 SNES Games of All Time" describing the game as bold and memorable. In 1995, Total! listed the game 35th in their "Top 100 SNES Games", commenting its game size, graphics and strong storyline.

Legacy 
Game journalists and fans often consider Soul Blazer to be the first in an unofficial series followed by Illusion of Gaia and Terranigma. This series is nicknamed either "Quintet Trilogy", "Gaia Trilogy" or "Heaven and Earth Trilogy" (after Terranigma's Japanese title, which translates to "the creation of Heaven and Earth") by fans. The Granstream Saga is sometimes considered the fourth game in the series, as it was developed by Shade (a studio composed of former Quintet personnel), has similar themes, and makes references to the previous titles.

Notes

References

External links
MobyGames' entry for Soul Blazer

1992 video games
Enix games
Fantasy video games
Phoenixes in popular culture
Super Nintendo Entertainment System games
Super Nintendo Entertainment System-only games
Quintet (company) games
Role-playing video games
Video games developed in Japan
Single-player video games